Weverson may refer to:

 Weverson (footballer, born 1988), full name Weverson Patrick Rodrigues de Oliveira, Brazilian football midfielder
 Weverson (footballer, born 2000), full name Weverson Moreira da Costa, Brazilian football defender

See also
 Weverton (disambiguation)